Pardillana limbata, the Common Pardillana, is a species of short-horned grasshopper in the family Acrididae. It is found in Australia.

References

External links

 

Catantopinae
Taxa named by Carl Stål
Taxa described in 1878